Argyle Street is a street in Hobart, Tasmania. The street was named by Lachlan Macquarie either in reference to Argyll, Scotland, where he grew up, or for the Duke of Argyll, head of Clan Campbell. Lachlan's wife had been born Elizabeth Campbell.

Intersections

Commencing in the Hobart waterfront precinct at the northern end of Morrison Street, Argyle Street runs in a north-westerly direction through the Hobart CBD and North Hobart to its intersection with New Town Road in the suburb of New Town. It intersects with the following major streets (from south-east to north-west):

References

Streets in Hobart